Visa requirements for Burundian citizens are administrative entry restrictions by the authorities of other states placed on citizens of Burundi. As of 11 January 2022, Burundian citizens had visa-free or visa on arrival access to 51 countries and territories, ranking the Burundian passport 92nd in terms of travel freedom according to the Henley & Partners Passport Index.

Visa requirements map

Visa requirements

Dependent, Disputed, or Restricted territories
Unrecognized or partially recognized countries

Dependent and autonomous territories

Non-visa restrictions

See also

Visa policy of Burundi
Burundian passport
Visa requirements for Congo DR citizens
Visa requirements for Kenyan citizens
Visa requirements for Rwandan citizens
Visa requirements for South Sudanese citizens
Visa requirements for Tanzanian citizens
Visa requirements for Ugandan citizens

References and Notes
References

Notes

Burundi
Foreign relations of Burundi